Juan Querubin Miranda (March 8, 1912 – June 1, 1985) was the first  Representative of the 1st District of Camarines Sur, (1946–1949)  in the 1st Congress of the Commonwealth of the Philippines.  Before the onset of World War II, he was a sergeant with the Philippine Army assigned in Legazpi City. He also headed the Tancong Vaca Guerilla Unit organized by him and by two of his fellow Canaman townmates Elias Madrid and Leon SA. Aureus.

Family
Miranda married his first wife Eustaquia Miranda, when he was a Sargeant in the Army stationed in Legaspi City.  He has Five Children, Cesar, Domingo, Antonio, Norma and Thelma. His second wife he married after World War II Her name was Conchita Estrada, a Spanish mestiza and he had one son with her.
Juan Arthur Miranda, Jr.

War record
Miranda, together with Elias Madrid and Leon SA. Aureus, established on March 8, 1942  the first anti-Japanese resistance group in Camarines Sur, the Tangcong Vaca Guerilla Unit  which resolutely waged a guerilla warfare from 1942 to 1945. The group, in concert with other guerrilla forces,  was able to liberate the town of Naga (now Naga City) twice and successfully saved many lives of American and Filipino soldiers incarcerated by the Japanese during the war.

Miranda's  war exploits, however,  was marred by squabbles with other guerillas most notably with Francisco Boayes, a Filipino-Syrian, and leader of the Vinzons Travelling Guerillas (TVG) whom he suspected of nursing a strong  amorous interest in his beautiful wife.

Political career
Upon the conclusion of World War II, Miranda was appointed by Manuel Roxas as the representative of the 1st district of Camarines Sur in the post-war 1st Congress of the Commonwealth of the Philippines (1945–1946). His most significant legislative undertaking was in sponsoring a bill creating the City of Naga as a chartered city independent of the province of Camarines Sur, which was duly approved on December 15, 1948 by virtue of Republic Act No. 305.

References

1912 births
1985 deaths
Members of the House of Representatives of the Philippines from Camarines Sur
Philippine Army personnel of World War II